Makumbi is a surname. Notable people with the surname include:

 Godfrey Makumbi (1962–2015), Anglican bishop in Uganda
 James Makumbi (1942–2018), Ugandan physician and politician
 Jennifer Nansubuga Makumbi (born 1960s), Ugandan-British novelist and short story writer